Janq'u Quta (Aymara janq'u white, quta lake, white lake", also spelled Janco Ccota, Jankho Khota, Jankho Kkota, Jankho Kota, Janko Cota, Janko Khota, Janko Kota, Janccoccota, Jancoccota, Jancocota, Janjojota, Janjoqota, Jankokkota) may refer to:

Lakes
 Janq'u Quta (Batallas), in the Batallas Municipality, Los Andes Province, La Paz Department, Bolivia
 Janq'u Quta (El Alto), in the El Alto Municipality, Pedro Domingo Murillo Province, La Paz Department, Bolivia
 Janq'u Quta (La Paz), in the La Paz Municipality, Pedro Domingo Murillo Province, La Paz Department, Bolivia
 Janq'u Quta (Larecaja), in the Larecaja Province, La Paz Department, Bolivia
 Janq'u Quta (Yaco), in the Yaco Municipality, Loayza Province, La Department, Bolivia
 Janq'u Quta (Omasuyos), in the Omasuyos Province, La Paz Department, Bolivia
 Janq'u Quta (Arequipa), in the Arequipa Region, Peru
 Janq'u Quta (Puno), in the Puno Region, Peru

Mountain 
 Janq'u Quta (Inquisivi), in the Inquisivi Province, La Paz Department, Bolivia
 Janq'u Quta (Loayza), in the Loayza Province, La Paz Department, Bolivia

Places
 Janq'u Quta, Arequipa in the Arequipa Region, Peru